Kaicheng is a town of Shou County in southeastern Anhui province, China, located approximately halfway between Chao Lake and the Yangtze River. It has 2 residential communities and 8 villages under its administration.

References 

Towns in Anhui